Slavyanovo may refer to:

 in Bulgaria (written in Cyrillic as Славяново):
 Slavyanovo - a town in Pleven municipality, Pleven Province
 Slavyanovo, Haskovo Province - a village in Harmanli municipality, Haskovo Province
 Slavyanovo, Targovishte Province - a village in Popovo municipality, Targovishte Province